Kurisu is a village in Hiiumaa Parish, Hiiu County in northwestern Estonia.

References
 

Villages in Hiiu County